General elections will be held in the Dominican Republic on 19 May 2024 to elect a president, vice-president, 32 senators and 190 deputies.      

Incumbent President Luis Abinader is eligible for re-election.

Electoral system
The President of the Dominican Republic is elected using the two-round system; if no candidate receives 50% + 1 vote, or more, of the total votes, a second-round runoff will be held between the two candidates with the highest votes on the first round.

The 32 members of the Senate are elected from the 31 provinces and the Distrito Nacional using first-past-the-post voting.

The 190 members of the Chamber of Deputies are elected in three groups; 178 are elected by proportional representation from 32 multi-member constituencies based on the 31 provinces and the Distrito Nacional, with the number of seats based on the population of each province. A further seven members are elected by proportional representation by Dominican expatriates in 3 overseas constituencies, and five seats are allocated at the national level to parties that received at least 1% of the vote nationally, giving preference to those that did not win any of the 178 constituency seats.

The 20 seats in the Central American Parliament are elected by proportional representation.

Opinion polls

References

 

Dominican
General election
Elections in the Dominican Republic
Presidential elections in the Dominican Republic